Guardian Firewall is a VPN for iOS which also blocks data and location trackers.  Its network crypto suite is IPSec (Using IKEv2).  The service, which claims to collect no user information, takes the form of an app which first became available in June 2019. 

The company behind the product is Sudo Security Group.  Its founder is Will Strafach, a security researcher, (Known for work on iOS jailbreaking tools) and COO is Chirayu Patel.

Guardian Firewall was compared in 2020 to Lockdown.

References

External links 
 Guardian home page

Virtual private network services
IOS software
2019 software
2020 software